Evil 1999 is the third studio album by Norwegian black metal band Tulus. It was released in 1999, through Hammerheart Records.

Track listing

Personnel

Tulus 

 Blodstrup – vocals and guitar
 Sir Graanug – bass guitar
 Sarke – drums

Miscellaneous staff 

 Neseblod – engineering and mixing

References

External links 
 Evil 1999 at Encyclopaedia Metallum

1999 albums
Tulus (band) albums